Andy Dehnart (born August 26, 1977) is an American journalist and television critic. He may be best known as reality television's "longest-standing critic" for his online journalism, as he is the creator of the genre's first tracking website, realityblurred.com. He is a member of the Television Critics Association.

Currently a contributor of television criticism and cultural journalism to NPR, The Daily Beast and msnbc.com, Dehnart has also written for Salon.com, Wired.com, The Boston Globe, Metro, the Chicago Tribune and Playboy. He regularly appears on television and the radio to discuss reality TV and popular culture.

He created reality blurred in July 2000, and the daily-updated site quickly became a primary source for devotees of the reality TV explosion. The web site has received accolades from entertainment media, with Slate deeming it "the site the best culture weblog dedicated to television" and Entertainment Weekly awarding it an "A." USA Today named Dehnart one of the Top 100 People in Pop Culture in 2001.

Dehnart earned an MFA in nonfiction writing from Bennington College, where his non-fiction studies included a lecture which explored the cultural impact of blogging, then a relatively unknown phenomenon in popular culture.

Dehnart now teaches writing, journalism, and communication studies at Stetson University in DeLand, Florida, where he advises the student newspaper. He has also taught for Johns Hopkins University's Center for Talented Youth.

Earlier, Dehnart moved to Chicago in 1999 to work as managing editor of a non-profit website, and later he worked as a producer for thepavement.com, a site for recent college graduates, and BrassRing, a recruiting solutions company. A native of Naples, Florida, Dehnart received his BS from Stetson, where he majored in journalism and earned minors in political science and religious studies. While an undergraduate, he edited the weekly campus newspaper, The Reporter, for two years; both years, it was named the best private college newspaper in the state of Florida.

Dehnart is openly gay.

External links
 
 reality blurred: the reality TV news digest

References

1977 births
American gay writers
American LGBT journalists
Living people
Male journalists
Place of birth missing (living people)
American television critics
21st-century LGBT people